Holm Singer (born 23 July 1961  in Reichenbach, East Germany) is a former East German Stasi informant who betrayed local church officials. He worked from 1980 till 1989 for the East German secret police under the pseudonym IM "Schubert". (IM stands for "inoffizieller Mitarbeiter", civilian informant.)

In March 2008 Singer has won an interim injunction to prevent an exhibition in Reichenbach from including his name and clandestine activities. On April, 22 he "lost a legal bid to keep his identity from being made public" and the injunction was cancelled. The judicial process nevertheless continued and Singer′s case was widely discussed in German media.

In March 2010 the court finally decided that the exhibition maker can make the real name of "IM Schubert" public. "The activity of the IM, who had repeatedly admitted his past deeds", said the acting judge, was "of historical interest".

References

Further reading 
 Berhard Honnigfort: "Damals Spitzel, heute Opfer?", Frankfurter Rundschau, March 26, 2008. 
 Reiner Burger: "Nichts als die Wahrheit", Frankfurter Allgemeine Zeitung, July 5, 2008.

External links 
 “E.German Stasi informant wins battle to conceal past” (Reuters, March 25, 2008) 
 “Fear of the Stasi Lives On in Eastern Germany” (Spiegel online,  April 7, 2008)
 “Anwalt des früheren ‘IM Schubert’ kündigt Klage an” (Tagesspiegel, April 9, 2008) 
 “Stasi-spion: toch geen recht op privacy” (Algemeen Dagblad, April 22, 2008) 
 “Stasi informant loses court privacy battle” (The Local, April 22, 2008)
 Reiner Burger: “Vorbei, vergangen, vergessen?” (faz.net, December 21, 2008) 
 Hans-Jürgen Grasemann: “Wegweisende Urteile gegen Stasi-Spitzel“ (BWV-Bayern) 

1961 births
Living people
People from Vogtlandkreis
People of the Stasi
People from Bezirk Karl-Marx-Stadt